The Battle of Almenar also referred to as Almenara  was a battle in the Iberian theatre of the War of the Spanish Succession. 

In June 1710, the Bourbon-Spanish army of Phillip V crossed into Catalonia in an attempt to capture Balaguer; an Allied force of British, Portuguese, Dutch and Austrian troops supporting Archduke Charles countered these moves and the two armies met in battle just to the north of Lleida on the afternoon of 27 July. Philip's army was defeated and forced to withdraw behind the Ebro but remained intact.

Prelude 

By the spring of 1709, France was financially exhausted, the severe winter of 1708/09 led to widespread famine and Louis XIV was forced to withdraw French troops from Spain to reinforce his northern frontier. However, although the Battle of Malplaquet in September 1709 was technically an Allied victory, the casualties shocked Europe and halted their advance into France. In Spain, forces loyal to the Bourbon candidate Philip V recaptured Alicante in April 1709 and won a resounding victory over an Anglo-Portuguese army at La Gudiña in May. The Portuguese now declared an informal truce, allowing trade and agriculture to recommence.

All sides wanted peace but negotiations in The Hague over the winter and spring of 1709/10 failed when the Allies demanded Louis agree to remove his grandson Philip by force if necessary. This approach was summarised by the British Whig party slogan No Peace Without Spain but was a major miscalculation. There was growing opposition to the war in Britain, now the major financial backer of the Alliance while the campaign in Spain had largely been a failure. Phillip was far more popular with the Spanish than his rival Archduke Charles and so the war continued.

In May 1710, Phillip and the Spanish-Bourbon army under Villadarias crossed the Segre river into Catalonia hoping to capture Balaguer. The first attempt failed due to torrential rain but French reinforcements increased the Spanish army to 20,000 infantry and 6,000 cavalry and in June they tried again. The illness of the Allied commander Starhemberg enabled Philip to capture a number of small towns but after several weeks of marching and counter-marching, on 27 July Stanhope's division crossed the Segres at Alfarràs and combined with Starhemberg's forces on the heights of Almenar.

The battle 
Villadarias opened the battle with a cavalry attack on the Allied defences which initially gave way. The Spanish wasted the opening by pursuing groups of fleeing enemies and allowed the Allied lines to reform.

British infantry and dragoons on the Allied left led by Stanhope and George Carpenter attacked the Bourbon army's right wing which fled, taking the second line with it; British casualties included the Earl of Rochford, Colonel of the 3rd Dragoon Regiment who was killed as they broke the Spanish lines. The Austrians simultaneously attacked and destroyed the Bourbon right wing, Philip himself only just avoiding capture. 

The battle took place late in the afternoon, preventing the Allies from following up their victory and allowing the Bourbon forces to gather their scattered cavalry and reassemble in the town of Zaragoza or Saragossa.

Aftermath 
Shortly after this, Villadarias was replaced by the French general the Marquis de Bay, victor over an Anglo-Portuguese army at the Battle of La Gudina in May 1709. The Bourbon army was battered but largely intact.

References

Sources
 Falkner, James The War of the Spanish Succession; (Pen and Sword, 2015);
 Lynn, John A. The Wars of Louis XIV, 1667–1714. (Longman, 1999);
 Saint Simon, Louis; Memoirs of Louis XIV - Volume 7 (CreateSpace Independent Publishing, 2016); 
;

Almenar
Almenar
Almenar
Almenar
Almenar
Almenar
Almenar
Segrià
1710 in Spain